The following is a list of notable manga magazines that were, and are published outside Japan. Not all magazines abroad published their own manga or had the rights to serialize manga originally published in Japan. To qualify for this list, the magazine has to have serialized manga included, or have a section discussing manga. Manga discussion can either be through reviews, or upcoming manga release info in detail. All magazine titles are written the same way in English, unless otherwise noted.

See also
List of manga magazines
List of Japanese manga magazines by circulation
List of manga distributors

References

 
Manga magazines
Comics anthologies